Wandert Jacobus Dekkers, better known as Midas Dekkers (born 22 April 1946 in Haarlem), is a Dutch biologist, presenter, and writer of fiction and non-fiction for children and adults. At the age of eighteen, he gave himself the name Midas (after Midas Wolf from Donald Duck). 

The well-known children's book writer wrote over fifty children's and youth books, most of which contain stories. In his non-fictional youth books, Dekkers writes about subjects related to biology. Dekkers also writes fictional prose for adults. As a biologist, Dekkers is known for his sharp observations. He can explain biological-scientific themes with a sense of humour. Thanks to his writing style, his books have been reprinted many times.

Dekkers is also known for his often contrary and controversial opinions on subjects such as bestiality, having children, and sports.

Bibliography (incomplete) 

 1982 – Het walvismeer
 1985 – Houden beren echt van honing?, illustrations Thé Tjong-Khing.  (kinderboekenweekgeschenk)
 1992 – Lief dier. Over bestialiteit
 1995 – De kip en de pinguïn
 1997 – De vergankelijkheid
 1999 – De koe en de kanarie
 2002 – De larf
 2003 – Mummies
 2004 – Poot, bundeling columns
 2004 – Poes, bundeling columns
 2005 – Pets, bundeling columns
 2005 – De Hommel en andere beesten
 2005 – ...leest A. Koolhaas, collection of stories by Anton Koolhaas, collected by Midas Dekkers.
 2006 – De tor en de koeskoes, collection of columns
 2006 – Lichamelijke oefening
 2007 – De Walrus en andere beesten
 2008 – ...leest de jaloerse kip en andere beesten (audiobook)
 2009 –  Piep. Een kleine biologie der letteren (boekenweekessay)
 2011 – Rood: Een Bekoring
 2014 – De kleine verlossing of de lust van ontlasten
 2015 – De thigmofiel
 2017 – Volledige vergunning

External links 
 Official website

References 

Dutch biologists
Dutch columnists
Dutch children's writers
20th-century Dutch male writers
21st-century Dutch male writers
1946 births
Living people